The Mama Parsi Girls' Secondary School is in Karachi, Sindh, Pakistan. It was established on 1 April 1918.

History
Mama Parsi Girls' Secondary School was established on 1 April 1918 by Jamshed Nusserwanjee Mehta who collected three donations to found the school. At first the new Parsi girls' school functioned in a portion of the Bai Virbaijee School, and was only opened for the parsi community but later on Muhammad Ali Jinnah's request the school allowed muslim students as well. It then shifted in June 1919 to a large building which stands today at the corner of Haji Abdullah Haroon and Inverarity Roads. This building was known as Mama Mansion.

Construction of the present building called The Mama Parsi Girls' High School was started on 17 January 1920 and completed on 26 January 1925. Pupils had their first academic lessons in the new building on 1 of April 1925.

Mama Parsi Girls Secondary School celebrated its 98th anniversary in 2016. The Mama Parsi Girls' Secondary School will celebrate its 105th-anniversary bash next year i.e. 1 April 2023

Academic
The school works in two shifts: morning and afternoon. The afternoon shift consists of Classes I to VII, with Classes I and II and III IV having 3 sections each, D, E, & F and the rest have 3 sections each, D & E for the primary and E, F & G for the secondary.

After Class VIII, the girls are automatically transferred to the morning. The school has matriculation as well as Cambridge system. The students are required to give a test in grade five to be selected for the Cambridge system. The system starts from grade six.

House system
The house system was introduced in 1943. The purpose of this set up was to cultivate the sense of contribution, leadership skills, team building and community living among pupils both through academic and co-curricular activities.

Each house has a motto:
Mama: Before Honour Is Humility.
Pochaji: Live Simply, Give Amply, Love Wisely.
Contractor: Labor Omnia Vincit (Work Conquers All)
Dinshaw: Per Fidam (Faith)

School motto
Let humility, charity, faith and labour light our path.

Principals

J. Kelly, first official principal — December 1918
 Mary G. Boardman — 1919-1932
Cowashah Anklesaria — 1918-1941 (off and on as need arose)
Iris Henrietta Thompson — 1941-1969
Goola Bapuji Shroff — 1969-1974
Mani Shehriar Contractor — 1974-1991
Zarine Tehmurasp Mavalvala — 1991-2010
Furengeez D. Tampal — 2010 to date

References

External links
Official site

Educational institutions established in 1918
Girls' schools in Pakistan
Schools in Karachi
Zoroastrianism in Pakistan
1918 establishments in British India